Jacques Charon (27 February 1920 – 15 October 1975) was a French actor and film director.

Born in Paris, Charon trained at the Conservatoire national supérieur d'art dramatique (CNSAD) and made his début at the Comédie-Française in 1941. During his time there which lasted until his death, he played over 150 roles in the classical and modern repertoire.

Charon directed the 1968 feature film A Flea in Her Ear and the 1973 television movie Monsieur Pompadour.

He played Spalanzani in the complete recording of The Tales of Hoffmann (Decca, 1971).

Charon died in Paris and is buried in the Cimetière de Montmartre.

Selected filmography 
 Colonel Chabert (1943)
 Jericho (1946)
 The Royalists (1947)
 The Paris Waltz (1950)
 Le Dindon (1951)
 The Red Inn (1951)
 Dakota 308 (1951)
 Little Jacques (1953)
 Les Intrigantes (1954)
 How to Succeed in Love (1962)
 How Do You Like My Sister? (1964)
 A Flea in Her Ear (1968)

External links
 

French film directors
1920 births
1975 deaths
Sociétaires of the Comédie-Française
Burials at Montmartre Cemetery
20th-century French male actors
French male stage actors
French male film actors
French National Academy of Dramatic Arts alumni